"Anywhere but Here" is a song written by Buddy Cannon, Bob DiPiero and John Scott Sherrill, and recorded by American country music artist Sammy Kershaw. It was released in September 1992 as the fourth and final single from his debut album Don't Go Near the Water. It peaked at No. 10 on the Billboard Hot Country Songs chart and No. 17 on the Canadian RPM country singles chart.

Critical reception
Deborah Evans Price, of Billboard magazine reviewed the song favorably, saying that Kershaw "adds a bit of George Jones flair on this particular number."

Music video
The music video was directed by Mary Matthews and Jeff Smith, and premiered in late 1992, and features a guest appearance by  NASCAR driver Mark Martin.

Chart performance
"Anywhere but Here" debuted at number 73 on the U.S. Billboard Hot Country Singles & Tracks for the week of October 3, 1992.

References

1992 singles
Sammy Kershaw songs
Song recordings produced by Buddy Cannon
Songs written by Buddy Cannon
Songs written by Bob DiPiero
Songs written by John Scott Sherrill
Song recordings produced by Norro Wilson
Mercury Records singles
1991 songs